Blok D ( meaning Block D) is an upper stage used on Soviet and later Russian expendable launch systems, including the N1, Proton-K and Zenit.

The stage (and its derivatives) has been included in more than 320 launched rockets . By 2002 its modification Blok DM had a 97% success rate in 218 flights since 1974, and 43 successful missions in 1997–2002.

The stage was developed in the 1960s as the fifth stage ('Д' is the fifth letter in the Cyrillic alphabet) for the Soviet Moonshot N1 rocket. The stage first flew in March 1967 while testing Zond of the moonshot program system. During crewed lunar flight Blok D would be used for mid-course corrections on the flight to the Moon, then to place the lunar orbiter and lander into a lunar orbit, and decelerate moon-lander out onto its landing trajectory.

Blok D was also included as fourth stage of Proton-K and as such flew on uncrewed Soviet missions to Moon, Mars (Mars 3) and Venus. It was used in the Proton-K configuration of the rocket and is still in use in the newer Proton-M variant (along with the Briz-M).

Blok DM also flies as the third stage for the Zenit-3SL rocket, which is used by the Sea Launch project to launch geostationary satellites. In 2002 a Blok DM3 failed in the attempted launch of Astra 1K.

The stage uses liquid oxygen (LOX) and kerosene as propellants, and has one single-chamber RD-58 main engine. The LOX tank has a spherical shape; the kerosene tank is toroidal, inclined to 15 degrees for better fuel extraction, with the engine mounted in the center of torus. Tanks include the first pump stage for the engine; the main pump is mounted on the engine.

Blok D weighs 3.5 tons during liftoff, but some parts are jettisoned and the dry mass in space is 2.5 tons. It has 5.70 meters length and generates 83.300 kN thrust for 600 seconds burn time. Blok D was modified as Blok DM in 1974, with 11D-58S engine. The unit cost is $4 million.

Since 1990, all variations of this stage have been built in the Krasnoyarsk Machine-Building Plant.

Modifications 

RKK Energia, the company that created Blok D, used it as a platform for many modifications over many years for different purposes; for example, the main propulsion unit on Buran started as a modification of the Blok D.

Variants

See also 

 Blok DM-03 – Advanced version of this stage.
 N-1 – original launch vehicle for which this stage was developed.
 Proton – launch vehicle that has flown the most with this stage.
 Zenit-3 – launch vehicle that uses this stage.
 Angara A5 – launch vehicle that will use this stage when launched from Vostochny Cosmodrome

References

External links 
 Russian Space Web
 https://web.archive.org/web/20120716190506/http://www.friends-partners.org/oldfriends/jgreen/blockd.html
 Boeing stands by Block DM's reliability

Soviet inventions
Rocket stages
Rocket engines using kerosene propellant